American Gladiators is an American competition television program that aired weekly in syndication from September 1989 to May 1996. The series matched a cast of amateur athletes against each other, as well as against the show's own "gladiators", in contests of strength and agility.

The concept was originally created in 1982 by Johnny C. Ferraro and Dan Carr.  Carr gathered the Gladiators and hosted the show, and Ferraro financed and produced the original competition at Erie Tech High School in Erie, Pennsylvania so Ferraro could have the event on film as to shop the new creation. In 1983 Ferraro financed, developed and packaged the American Gladiators as a movie project. In 1984 Carr sold his interest in a literary purchase to Flor-Jon Films. Ferraro had been the main driving force behind the American Gladiators brand since 1982. In 1987, Flor-Jon Films then licensed the unscripted rights to The Samuel Goldwyn Company (now part of MGM). Ferraro is the sole creator of the 1994 kids' version of the series, Gladiators 2000 (a.k.a. G2).

An all-star, one-off primetime celebrity special, Superstar American Gladiators aired on ABC on May 4, 1995.

Flor-Jon Films, Inc and the Samuel Goldwyn Co in 1993 granted a license to Chariot Entertainment in an effort to launch a live American Gladiators show on the Las Vegas Strip, but the president of Chariot became mired in a securities fraud prosecution, through no fault of Flor-Jon Films or The Samuel Goldwyn Co, and the live show went unrealized.  Episodes from the original series were played on ESPN Classic from 2007 to 2009.   Several episodes are available for download on Apple's iTunes Service. The streaming service Pluto TV, has all episodes on demand as well as a live channel showing reruns from all 7 seasons, in the United States.

MGM Television, the successor company to the Samuel Goldwyn Company, during the 2007–08 Writers Guild of America strike, sold to NBC a prime-time revival that was closer to the British version than the American, with hosts Hulk Hogan and Lalia Ali, and Van Earl Wright the play-by-play voice.  That version lasted two seasons.

In July 2014, a revival of American Gladiators was planned in the works by A. Smith & Co. Productions where it would have incorporated elements that were inspired by the popular film franchise The Hunger Games along with mixed martial arts.

In August 2018, MGM Television, with Ferraro and actors Seth Rogen and Evan Goldberg, announced plans to bring American Gladiators back again for the 2019–20 season, the 30th anniversary of the franchise's television debut.

In September 2021, it was reported that MGM Television has teamed up with WWE (formerly WWF) for a reboot of American Gladiators that will feature WWE wrestlers. The project is currently being pitched to broadcasters and streaming platforms.

Competition
American Gladiators featured four competitors, two men and two women, in most episodes. The players, referred to throughout the series as "contenders", faced off in a series of physical games against each other and against a cast of costumed athletes looking to prevent them from succeeding (the titular "Gladiators"). Each match saw the competitors trying to advance in a tournament, with one man and one woman crowned champion at its conclusion.

Initial tournament format
When the series premiered in the fall of 1989, ten men and ten women were selected to participate with several more chosen to be alternates in case one or more of the contenders had to withdraw due to injury. The tournament was spread out over the course of thirteen episodes. The winning contenders from the first five episodes advanced to the quarterfinal round of the tournament, and the three highest scoring non-winners also received berths to set the 
field at eight contenders per side. After the preliminary round, any injury alternates came from the pool of defeated contenders.

Once the quarterfinals began, the tournament became a single-elimination affair. Reaching the semifinal round guaranteed a contender would leave with no less than $2,500 in cash. The tournament runner-up would receive $5,000, while the winner was to receive $10,000 and an opportunity to become a Gladiator.

However, in response to the initial popularity of the show, the producers decided to produce a new tournament shortly after the first one concluded. Twenty more men and women were selected for the second competition, which began airing during the second half of the television season in 1990, and the same tournament rules were applied. The initial tournament's champions, in lieu of becoming Gladiators, were invited back to face off with the winners of the new tournament in what the show called its Grand Championship. The winners of this match would be declared the season's overall champions and be rewarded with additional prizes. When the show's second season premiered in the fall of 1990, the same format was used.

Changes
In seasons three and four, the field competitors increased to 48 and the tournament format was adjusted. Six preliminary round matches were played and the winners of those matches automatically advanced to the quarterfinals. The winners of the three quarterfinal matches advanced to the semifinals, along with the highest scoring non-winner. The semifinals and finals went on as before with the winners of the half-season tournaments meeting in the Grand Championship.

For season five, the tournament format was revamped again. A total of thirty-two men and women were selected to compete, with eight men and eight women chosen for each half-season tournament. The preliminary rounds were played for seeding purposes rather than to advance into the quarterfinals, with the eight contenders on each side ranked in order of how they performed in their initial matches. Once seeded, the tournament continued as it had in previous years, with the main difference being that there was no longer a need for wild card berths.

In seasons six and seven, the tournament format was changed to resemble the format used on the British Gladiators series at the time. Each match was played for cash, with the winners earning $2,500 for a victory. Once all of the qualified contenders had competed, the four men and four women with the highest winning scores in their matches advanced in the tournament. Two semifinal matches were then conducted, with the winners of those matches winning an additional $7,500 and advancing to the Grand Championship. 

In season six, the Grand Championship winners would each receive an additional $15,000 on top of what they had already won, making their total cash prize out to $25,000. Season seven’s winners were given an additional $10,000, with their total cash winnings amounting to $20,000. That season’s Grand Champions were also given berths as the United States representatives in the second International Gladiators competition, held at the site of the British series in Birmingham, England. 

During the first half of the first season, the show's set resembled that of an ancient Roman gladiatorial arena, with the stands raised high above the ground. For the second half, the show's set was changed into a modern indoor sports arena style. An onscreen clock was added in the second half of the season, which allowed viewers to see how much time a contender had left to complete an event.

The hooded figures that officiated the games were replaced by veteran NFL referee Bob McElwee (No. 95). Starting in Season 2, former Pacific-10 football referee Larry Thompson became the referee.  In case of ruling explanations, a host would interview the referee for an explanation.

Production base
The first two seasons were recorded on a soundstage at Universal Studios Hollywood. Beginning with the third season and continuing for the rest of the run, the show relocated production to the CBS Studio Center in Studio City, Los Angeles. The studio used to tape the show was referred to on air as “Gladiator Arena”.

Events

In each episode, the contenders competed in a series of events. Six to eight events were played per show, varying from season to season. Most of the events tested the contenders' physical abilities against the superior size and strength of the Gladiators, who were mostly pro or amateur bodybuilders and former football players. In most events, the contenders were not directly pitted against each other, but against the Gladiators. In each event, the contenders earned points based on their performance. In the first half of season one, the points in each event were given in minimum 5-point increments, with 100 points usually the maximum in every event. After the first half of the first season, single point increments were used.

Some events had objectives where each contender had to perform a certain task against the Gladiator, while the Gladiator was trying to do the same thing to them (such as attempting to knock each other off the platforms in Joust). In these types of events, where a clear winner could emerge, contenders were usually awarded ten points for defeating the Gladiator and five points if the event was a draw. No points were awarded to the contender if the Gladiator won.

Other events had no maximum score, with the objective being to perform a task as many times as possible (such as scoring goals in Powerball) within the set time limit for the event. Points in this case would be awarded based on how many times the contender accomplished the objective during the event.

Starting with the fourth season, the final event before The Eliminator, was labeled "Crunch Time", and was played for more points.

Season six used a format in which events were referred to as "rounds" due to more than one game played per round. Three games per show were played by both males and females and three were split between the males and females, two each in a round. In split rounds the men went first. Including the Eliminator, ten events appeared in each episode, and the lineup of single and split rounds changed during the season. The sole exception to this format was in the semi-finals and grand championship, in which each round was a single event.

There were four lineups used during the season:

The Eliminator was the final event played in each episode, and determined which contender would win that day's competition. The contenders competed side-by-side to complete a large obstacle course as quickly as they could. In the first two seasons, the Eliminator had a time limit, and both contenders started the course at the same time.  Contenders scored points for every second left on the clock when they finished the course; the contender with the highest final score won the day's competition. Beginning in season 3, the contender in the lead was given a head start with each point they led by worth a half-second; the first contender to cross the finish line won.

Of the events that debuted in the show's first season, only six lasted the entire original run on American television: Breakthrough and Conquer, The Wall, Joust, Assault, Powerball, and the Eliminator, although The Wall did not debut until the second half of the first season.

List of gladiators

Production

Segments
Throughout the series, American Gladiators had several regular segments that were not related to the competition of the day.  These segments were used to allow the audience to get to know the Gladiators or to highlight some of the best moments of past competitions.
 Gladiator Moments (Season 3): Gladiators reflect and talk about their favorite moments of the first two seasons of American Gladiators.
 Ask a Gladiator (Seasons 3 and 4): Fans write to their favorite American Gladiator asking them questions.
 Csonka's Zonks (Season 4): Brief array of clips featuring the funniest moments of the show which includes mostly hits, tackles, and tumbles of the contenders and Gladiators.
 30 Seconds With: (Seasons 5 and 6): In season 5 Gladiators are asked a number of fill-in-the-blank questions. Then in season 6 the questions were taken away and it was just the Gladiators talking about a random topic.

Production notes
The show was taped at Universal Studios Hollywood until 1991, then moved to Gladiator Arena (Studio 3) at CBS Studio Center in Studio City for the rest of its initial run. The National Indoor Arena, home to the UK version, hosted the International Gladiators competitions.

The series, a co-production of Trans World International and Four Point Entertainment, was distributed by Samuel Goldwyn Television.

The original Pilot was hosted by Fran Tarkenton and Tim Wrightman.

The first 13 episodes were recorded from July 24 to August 5, 1989. The remaining 13 episodes of the first season began production on January 9, 1990. The entire 26 episode second season was recorded in five weeks from June to July 1990.

Prizes
During the first half of season one, the intention was to reward the winners by promoting them to the role of American Gladiators, but that reward was never implemented and was abandoned after the first half of the first season.

The show awarded cash prizes depending on how far the contenders advanced. For the first five seasons, $10,000 cash was awarded for winning the half-season finals. Runners-up in these finals were guaranteed $5,000. Contenders that lost in the semi-final rounds were guaranteed $2,500 for advancing that far. Grand Champions received $15,000 more, while the runners up won $10,000 more. In the first two seasons a new 1990 or 1991 Chevrolet automobile of the Grand Champion's choice, worth up to $20,000 (vehicle selections included GM vehicles such as the Lumina, Lumina APV, Cavalier, Metro, Tracker, Storm, C/K pickup, Caprice, Suburban, Camaro, Beretta, Blazer, etc.), were awarded to the Grand Champions. In season 3, a 1992 Chevrolet S-10 Blazer and in season 4 a 1993 Suzuki Sidekick was awarded to the Grand Champion, and the runner up received a Club Med vacation. The runner up prize was eliminated in the fifth season.

To coincide with the change in tournament structure in season six, contenders won $2,500 for winning matches. Once the competition reached the semifinals, the winners received $10,000. The Grand Champions for that season won an additional $20,000, while the runners-up won an additional $5,000. In season seven, the structure was the same but the Grand Champions won an additional $10,000 for their victories and a berth in the second International Gladiators competition.

Hosts and other personalities
Joe Theismann and Mike Adamle co-hosted American Gladiators during the first half of the first season, with Theismann presiding over the proceedings and Adamle serving more of an analyst's role. After Theismann left the series, Adamle became the lead commentator and remained in that role for the remainder of the series. Todd Christensen initially was Adamle's replacement as analyst, with Larry Csonka joining the series at the beginning of season two in 1990. Csonka was replaced by Lisa Malosky following the fourth season, and she held the analyst position for seasons five and six. Danny Lee Clark, who spent the first three seasons and most of season six on the show as Gladiator Nitro, became co-host for the final season and was credited on air as Dan "Nitro" Clark.

Adamle also hosted both seasons of International Gladiators and was joined by John Fashanu in season one and Ulrika Jonsson and Kimberley Joseph in season two.

A referee wearing an executioner costume appeared during the first half of the first season (portrayed by former football player Jeff Benson). Then-NFL referee Bob McElwee became the referee for the second half of season one. Larry Thompson (a former Pacific-10 Football referee) took over for season two in 1990 and remained until the series ended in 1996. The referees were assisted by several game judges, including Bob Wucetich, Fred Gallagher and Jim Marcione. During International Gladiators, Thompson was also joined by the British Gladiators referee, John Anderson.

Theismann also was the announcer of the first season and was replaced by John Harlan in 1990, who remained with the show through the 1992–1993 season. There was no announcer after that, although Adamle introduced the Gladiators in the final season.

Champions

International broadcasts
American Gladiators was broadcast in the UK by ITV as part of their Night Time slot starting on September 1, 1990. In 1992, ITV debuted their own version called Gladiators and in doing so became the first country to adapt American Gladiators.

Other ventures

Reruns
USA Network was the first network to air reruns of American Gladiators, acquiring a total of 104 episodes. In 1992, USA began airing episodes daily in the late afternoon following its game show rerun lineup and preceding Cartoon Express, and later moved the episodes to air as part of its mid-morning lineup. The network initially had rights to the first three seasons and picked up rights to the fourth when it finished airing in 1993, but did not pick up any additional seasons beyond that. USA aired reruns through at least 1996, just as the show ended its original run.

Spike TV purchased a rerun package they began airing during their last days as The National Network in 2002. Originally airing weekday afternoons and late night Saturdays, Spike eventually scaled back the reruns to the late Saturday airing and then dropped them in 2003. Spike was only given rights to seasons two through four in their entirety, special episodes from seasons five and six, season seven in its entirety, and both editions of International Gladiators in their entirety.

In 2007, ESPN added the entire original series to ESPN Classic's lineup. This meant that the non-specials from seasons five and six saw their first airings since their respective seasons and the first season, including the episodes under the original format, would be seen for the first time since USA carried the series. ESPN Classic briefly pulled the original American Gladiators series from its lineup shortly after a revival premiered in 2008, but returned it after the revival concluded. ESPN permanently removed the show from ESPN Classic in 2009.

In 2017, after an absence from television lasting several years, American Gladiators reruns returned to the air with the launch of the Sinclair Broadcast Group's action-themed broadcast network Charge!. Edited reruns of the UK Gladiators series were also added. As of 2020, both shows are no longer on the Charge! schedule.

As of April 2018, SI TV (Sports Illustrated TV) has added the original series to their premium channel add on for Amazon Prime.

In October 2019, a channel dedicated to the original show, as well as the 2008 revival was added to Pluto TVon channel 136, later channel 303. Episodes spanned the entire run of both shows, with only the International Gladiators episodes absent. On October 1, 2021, the channel was removed from the lineup.

30 for 30
On April 12, 2021, it was announced that an upcoming documentary film about American Gladiators for the ESPN series 30 for 30 was going to be produced by Vice Studios and ESPN Films directed by Ben Berman.

Home media
On July 14, 2009 Shout! Factory released  The Battle Begins, featuring commentary from the Lazer, Zap, and Nitro, and an interview with Billy Wirth.  This DVD only has the last 14 episodes of season one (the mid-season recap, and the second half of season one).

Soundtrack

In 1993, American Gladiators: The Music was released by DCC Compact Classics/Sandstone Music, featuring songs used on the show, Dan Milner's music for the games and the opening and closing themes by Bill Conti.

American Gladiators Orlando Live!
In 1995, American Gladiators performed a dinner show in Orlando, Florida. This dinner show featured Dallas, Laser, Hawk, Ice, Jazz, Nitro, Sabre, Siren, Sky, Tower, and Turbo from the TV show along with the new Gladiators Apache, Cobra, Electra, Flame, Flash, Jade, Quake, Rage, Raven, Tank, Thor, Tigra, Titan, Viper. The events included The Wall, Breakthrough and Conquer, Assault, Whiplash, the Eliminator and others.

Other versions

Gladiators 2000

A kids version of the show called Gladiators 2000 (also known as G2) hosted by Ryan Seacrest and Maria Sansone (later Valerie Rae Miller in season 2) where it had traditional games mixed with trivia questions thrown in for educational value aired in syndication from September 9, 1994 until May 5, 1996.

Superstar American Gladiators
An hour-long, one-off celebrity primetime special called Superstar American Gladiators hosted by Pat O'Brien and Kim Alexis Duguay aired on ABC on May 4, 1995 where four teams of stars from the four major television networks of ABC, CBS, NBC & FOX each lead by an American Gladiator from the original syndicated version as their team captain competed against the gladiators from the syndicated series in various contest for $15,000 and the Superstar Gladiator Trophy. The celebrities in this special were: Sarah Chalke, Debbe Dunning, Darius McCrary & Holly Robinson (representing ABC Team; Hawk was their team captain); Charlie Robinson, Victoria Rowell, Shadoe Stevens & Helene Udy (representing CBS Team; Sky was their team captain); Drake Hogestyn, Mario Lopez, Marsha Warfield & Tina Yothers (representing Team NBC; Sabre was their team captain) & Tichina Arnold, Jensen Daggett, David Goldsmith & John Henton (representing FOX Team; Ice was their team captain).

2008 revival

A revival of American Gladiators hosted by Hulk Hogan and Laila Ali aired on NBC from January 6 until August 4, 2008.

See also
Gladiators (television franchise)
American Gladiators (2008 TV series), the 2008 revival
American Gladiators, 1992 video game
Superstar American Gladiators, a primetime special that aired on ABC in 1995.
Gladiators 2000, a spinoff of AG for children
Nickelodeon Guts, a children's athletic competition program
My Family's Got Guts, the 2008 revival of GUTS
Jeux Sans Frontières

References

External links
 

1989 American television series debuts
1996 American television series endings
1980s American game shows
1990s American game shows
English-language television shows
First-run syndicated television programs in the United States
Gladiators (franchise)
Television series by MGM Television
Television shows adapted into video games